"De Verdad" (Eng.: Truly) is the first single released from Soy the tenth studio album by Mexican singer Alejandra Guzmán. The track was written by Steve Mandle, Julia Sierra and Jodi Marr.

Music video
The music video for this single was directed by Ernesto Fundora and presents Alejandra dating a guy and then his face changes constantly (thanks to the morphing special effects) so she can never know "truly" who he is.

Chart performance

2001 singles
Alejandra Guzmán songs
2001 songs
Songs written by Jodi Marr